The Bregman-Lagrangian framework permits a systematic understanding of the matching rates associated with higher-order gradient methods in discrete and continuous time.

References

Optimization algorithms and methods